Drew Petrie (born 15 October 1982) is a former professional Australian rules footballer who played for the North Melbourne Football Club and the West Coast Eagles in the Australian Football League (AFL). He came out of retirement in 2017 to play for the West Coast Eagles in the Western Australian Football League (WAFL).

AFL career
Petrie debuted in 2001 and played more than 300 games for North Melbourne Football Club. He played in a variety of roles for the Kangaroos including centre half-forward, defence and ruck. In a game against the Western Bulldogs in 2007 he helped inspire North Melbourne to a win in Glenn Archer's 300th match, kicking seven goals—six of them in the first quarter.

Petrie was selected by coach Mick Malthouse for Australia in the International Rules series against Ireland as a utility player.  He was a key player during the second test at MCG, scoring two overs (three points each) in quick succession early in the last quarter.  He added a goal (six points) in the final minute giving Australia some hope of snatching a win.  In the end, however, Ireland won the series by five points (on aggregate).

Petrie was named vice-captain of North Melbourne at the start of the 2009 season and filled-in for the newly appointed captain, Brent Harvey, who missed half the season with an elbow injury. Petrie was North Melbourne's top goal scorer in 2009 with 27 goals and again in 2011 with 48.

After missing most of the 2010 season. In 2011, Petrie was selected in the All-Australian Team on the interchange.

Early in the season Petrie struggled to have the same impact as the previous year. However the forward was still finding ways to get on the scoreboard, kicking a respectable 12 goals in the first seven games. From that point he turned on an impressive feat of goal kicking form, managing 46 in the final 15 matches despite being used as a decoy on multiple occasions. Petrie kicked 23 goals between rounds 16 and 19 to temporarily lead the Coleman Medal. His final tally of 58 goals was the highest of his career and pushed him past 250 career goals.

Petrie was instrumental in North's 2014 elimination final defeat of arch rival Essendon.

In August 2016, North Melbourne announced they would not renew Petrie's contract for the 2017 season. He was subsequently drafted by the West Coast Eagles in the 2017 rookie draft.

In 2019 a lack of numbers generally and a lack of tall forwards contributed to the West Coast Eagles requesting Drew, then an assistant coach pulled back on the boots to play for the WAFL side

Statistics

|- style="background-color: #EAEAEA"
! scope="row" style="text-align:center" | 2001
|
| 20 || 9 || 0 || 0 || 26 || 9 || 35 || 10 || 13 || 38 || 0.0 || 0.0 || 2.9 || 1.0 || 3.9 || 1.1 || 1.4 || 4.2 || 0
|- 
! scope="row" style="text-align:center" | 2002
|
| 20 || 10 || 10 || 7 || 45 || 22 || 67 || 20 || 30 || 24 || 1.0 || 0.7 || 4.5 || 2.2 || 6.7 || 2.0 || 3.0 || 2.4 || 0
|- style="background-color: #EAEAEA"
! scope="row" style="text-align:center" | 2003
|
| 20 || 22 || 28 || 21 || 172 || 64 || 236 || 107 || 67 || 76 || 1.3 || 1.0 || 7.8 || 2.9 || 10.7 || 4.9 || 3.0 || 3.5 || 3
|- 
! scope="row" style="text-align:center" | 2004
|
| 20 || 22 || 20 || 18 || 166 || 57 || 223 || 84 || 53 || 52 || 0.9 || 0.8 || 7.5 || 2.6 || 10.1 || 3.8 || 2.4 || 2.4 || 1
|- style="background-color: #EAEAEA"
! scope="row" style="text-align:center" | 2005
|
| 20 || 22 || 11 || 7 || 169 || 59 || 228 || 84 || 66 || 229 || 0.5 || 0.3 || 7.7 || 2.7 || 10.4 || 3.8 || 3.0 || 10.4 || 0
|- 
! scope="row" style="text-align:center" | 2006
|
| 20 || 21 || 4 || 3 || 208 || 104 || 312 || 158 || 54 || 87 || 0.2 || 0.1 || 9.9 || 5.0 || 14.9 || 7.5 || 2.6 || 4.1 || 5
|- style="background-color: #EAEAEA"
! scope="row" style="text-align:center" | 2007
|
| 20 || 25 || 38 || 16 || 226 || 78 || 304 || 138 || 66 || 125 || 1.5 || 0.6 || 9.0 || 3.1 || 12.2 || 5.5 || 2.6 || 5.0 || 5
|- 
! scope="row" style="text-align:center" | 2008
|
| 20 || 23 || 17 || 15 || 228 || 139 || 367 || 154 || 57 || 219 || 0.7 || 0.7 || 9.9 || 6.0 || 16.0 || 6.7 || 2.5 || 9.5 || 11
|- style="background-color: #EAEAEA"
! scope="row" style="text-align:center" | 2009
|
| 20 || 22 || 27 || 21 || 221 || 111 || 332 || 145 || 89 || 82 || 1.2 || 1.0 || 10.0 || 5.0 || 15.1 || 6.6 || 4.0 || 3.7 || 5
|- 
! scope="row" style="text-align:center" | 2010
|
| 20 || 2 || 0 || 1 || 13 || 8 || 21 || 7 || 5 || 2 || 0.0 || 0.5 || 6.5 || 4.0 || 10.5 || 3.5 || 2.5 || 1.0 || 0
|- style="background-color: #EAEAEA"
! scope="row" style="text-align:center" | 2011
|
| 20 || 21 || 48 || 41 || 222 || 72 || 294 || 129 || 58 || 98 || 2.3 || 2.0 || 10.6 || 3.4 || 14.0 || 6.1 || 2.8 || 4.7 || 11
|- 
! scope="row" style="text-align:center" | 2012
|
| 20 || 23 || 58 || 18 || 205 || 91 || 296 || 147 || 56 || 55 || 2.5 || 0.8 || 8.9 || 4.0 || 12.9 || 6.4 || 2.4 || 2.4 || 9
|- style="background-color: #EAEAEA"
! scope="row" style="text-align:center" | 2013
|
| 20 || 22 || 48 || 19 || 230 || 79 || 309 || 133 || 63 || 72 || 2.2 || 0.9 || 10.5 || 3.6 || 14.0 || 6.0 || 2.9 || 3.3 || 10
|- 
! scope="row" style="text-align:center" | 2014
|
| 20 || 25 || 50 || 39 || 213 || 90 || 303 || 135 || 61 || 23 || 2.0 || 1.6 || 8.5 || 3.6 || 12.1 || 5.4 || 2.4 || 0.9 || 2
|- style="background-color: #EAEAEA"
! scope="row" style="text-align:center" | 2015
|
| 20 || 24 || 42 || 29 || 219 || 98 || 317 || 168 || 62 || 11 || 1.8 || 1.2 || 9.1 || 4.1 || 13.2 || 7.0 || 2.6 || 0.5 || 7
|- 
! scope="row" style="text-align:center" | 2016
|
| 20 || 23 || 27 || 19 || 168 || 85 || 253 || 110 || 52 || 13 || 1.2 || 0.8 || 7.3 || 3.7 || 11.0 || 4.8 || 2.3 || 0.6 || 3
|- style="background-color: #EAEAEA"
! scope="row" style="text-align:center" | 2017
|
| 21 || 16 || 16 || 3 || 132 || 61 || 193 || 76 || 53 || 195 || 1.0 || 0.2 || 8.3 || 3.8 || 12.1 || 4.8 || 3.3 || 12.2 || 0
|- class="sortbottom"
! colspan=3| Career
! 332
! 444
! 277
! 2863
! 1227
! 4090
! 1805
! 905
! 1401
! 1.3
! 0.8
! 8.6
! 3.7
! 12.3
! 5.4
! 2.7
! 4.2
! 72
|}

References

External links

1982 births
Living people
North Melbourne Football Club players
Australian rules footballers from Ballarat
Greater Western Victoria Rebels players
All-Australians (AFL)
People educated at St Patrick's College, Ballarat
West Coast Eagles players
Australia international rules football team players
West Coast Eagles (WAFL) players
East Perth Football Club players